Die Zeit,  die Zeit is the name of a Novel by Martin Suter, that was published in September 2012 by Diogenes Verlag.

Content  
The protagonist is Peter Taler, a 42-year-old who works at a building company. Taler‘s wife Laura was shot in front of their flat and he can’t stop thinking of her. His aim is to locate and kill the killer of his wife. 
Every evening he observes surrounding houses, which leads his attention to his  neighbour Knupp, whose wife died of malaria 20 years ago. Knupp feels guilty of her death. The  82-year-old is time nihilist and holds a thesis, that time doesn’t exist, but changes do. Therefore he wants to arrange the area  – trees, cars etc. – just like it looks on pictures from the year 1991, when his wife died. He hopes to gain his wife back that way.
With pictures, which promise hints about the killer of  Taler’s wife, Knupp blackmails Taler and forces him to help with his rearrangements. Both men rebuild houses, gardens and Knupp’s house to their appearance in 1991 with extensive financial and  temporal costs. During the rebuilding efforts, Taler finds out that Knupp is the killer of his wife and kills him right away.

Critic 
"A novel that activates thinking and turns our world topsy-turvy for a moment. "The time, the time" is a necessity for all fans of Suter and those, who want become it.|Hessian Broadcasting, 29  August 2012."

Book 
 Hardcover: Diogenes, Zurich 2012,

External links 
 Rezension auf SpiegelOnline - review at SpiegelOnline in german
 Das Buch auf der Homepage des Verlags - book presentation in german
 Leseprobe - reading in german PDF

2012 novels
Postmodern novels
Diogenes Verlag books